The second running of the Tour of Flanders for Women, a women's road cycling race in Belgium, was held on 3 April 2005. It was the fourth round of the 2005 UCI Women's Road World Cup. Dutch rider Mirjam Melchers-Van Poppel won the race, after distancing her teammate and breakaway companion Susanne Ljungskog.

The race for third place ended in farcical circumstances. The chasing group of 20 riders, including World Cup leader Oenone Wood, was sent the wrong way in the final two kilometres and crossed the finish line in the opposite direction. None of the riders in the group were included in the final result. Italian Monia Baccaille was officially placed third, after winning the sprint of the third group.

Race Summary
Mirjam Melchers attacked with approximately 25 km to go on the run-in to the Muur van Geraardsbergen. On the Muur, she had a 15-second lead when her teammate, Susanne Ljungskog, attacked in pursuit and caught Melchers 200 m after the climb. The pair cooperated to the finish as the chasing bunch of 20 did not move closer than 40 seconds. Melchers accelerated away from her Buitenpoort-Flexpoint teammate with 200 m to go to and won her third World Cup race.

Result

References

External links

2005
Tour
2005 UCI Women's Road World Cup